Strumaria truncata is a species of flowering plant in the family Amaryllidaceae, native to the Cape Provinces of South Africa. It is widely distributed in the northwest of the Cape Provinces, and the most common of the Strumaria species found there. It forms small clumps of bulbs which produce twisted leaves. Its flowers, which are pendulous, vary in colour from white to deep pink. The pink forms were once treated as a separate species, Strumaria rubella, and have also been called var. rubella. The species was first described by Nikolaus Joseph von Jacquin in 1792.

References

truncata
Flora of the Cape Provinces
Plants described in 1792
Taxa named by Nikolaus Joseph von Jacquin